Alteripontixanthobacter is a genus of bacteria from the family of Erythrobacteraceae.

References 

Sphingomonadales
Bacteria genera